Grebenshchikov is a Russian surname. People with this surname include:
A. V. Grebenshchikov (1880–1941), Soviet scholar of Tungusic languages
George Grebenstchikoff (1883–1964), Russian writer
Boris Grebenshchikov (born 1953), Russian rock musician
Vladimir Grebenshchikov (born 1992), Kazakhstani ice hockey player

Russian-language surnames